The Flemington-Raritan Regional School District  is a comprehensive regional public school district in eastern Hunterdon County, New Jersey, United States, which serves students in pre-kindergarten through eighth grades from the neighboring communities of Flemington Borough and Raritan Township.

As of the 2018–19 school year, the district, comprising six schools, had an enrollment of 3,079 students and 327.8 classroom teachers (on an FTE basis), for a student–teacher ratio of 9.4:1.

The district is classified by the New Jersey Department of Education as being in District Factor Group "I", the second-highest of eight groupings. District Factor Groups organize districts statewide to allow comparison by common socioeconomic characteristics of the local districts. From lowest socioeconomic status to highest, the categories are A, B, CD, DE, FG, GH, I and J.

Public school students in ninth through twelfth grades attend Hunterdon Central Regional High School, part of the Hunterdon Central Regional High School District, which serves students in central Hunterdon County from Flemington and Raritan Township, as well as from Delaware Township, East Amwell Township and Readington Township. As of the 2018–19 school year, the high school had an enrollment of 2,844 students and 238.8 classroom teachers (on an FTE basis), for a student–teacher ratio of 11.9:1.

District overview
The District's four elementary schools offer students in grades K-4 a comprehensive educational program emphasizing process instruction techniques, cooperative learning, and integration of subject content areas. The K-2 program uses a balanced literacy approach to reading while math and science are taught through hands-on experiences. In heterogeneous classes, these students also study social studies and use computers. The 3-5 program includes literature-based reading, process writing, hands-on math and science, social studies and computers, all taught in heterogeneous classes. Teachers develop themes to integrate content areas wherever possible. Related arts instruction includes art, music, computer education, library skills, physical education, health and family life and world languages.

The Reading-Fleming Intermediate School houses the district's fifth and sixth grade students.

For grades 7-8, J.P. Case Middle School is organized as a house plan with academic teams at each grade level. This supports the small school atmosphere while providing various course options. Each team of students is taught the academic subjects by a corresponding team of teachers who meet regularly to monitor student progress and plan instructional programs. Academic subjects include reading, language arts, math, science, and social studies. An expanded related arts curriculum includes instruction in world languages, home economics and material processing, as well as art, music, computer education, library skills, physical education, and health and family life.

Awards and recognition
NAMM named the district in its 2008 survey of the "Best Communities for Music Education", which included 110 school districts nationwide.

Schools 
The district consists of four PreK/K to 4 elementary schools, one intermediate school for grades 5 and 6 and a middle school for grades 7 and 8. Schools in the district (with 2018–19 enrollment data from the National Center for Education Statistics) are:
Elementary schools
Barley Sheaf School (350 students; in grades K-4) - Flemington
Karen Gabruk, Principal
Mary Jane Custy, Vice Principal   
Copper Hill School (413; PreK-4) - Ringoes
Jesse Lockett, Principal
Amy Switkes, Vice Principal
Francis A. Desmares School (447; K-4) - Flemington
Mark Masessa, Principal
Nydia Peake, Vice Principal
Robert Hunter School (388; K-4) - Flemington
Sherri Glaab, Principal
Jessica Braynor, Vice Principal
Intermediate school
Reading-Fleming Intermediate School (682; 5-6) in Flemington
Anthony DeMarco, Principal
Jason Borawski, Vice Principal
Vanessa Ahmed, Vice Principal
Middle school
J. P. Case Middle School (781; 7-8) - Flemington
Bob Castellano, Principal
April Kay, Vice Principal
Peter Sibilia, Vice Principal

Administration
Core members of the district's administration are:
Kari McGann, Superintendent
Stephanie Voorhees, Business Administrator/Board Secretary

Board of education
The district's board of education, comprised of nine members, sets policy and oversees the fiscal and educational operation of the district through its administration. As a Type II school district, the board's trustees are elected directly by voters to serve three-year terms of office on a staggered basis, with three seats up for election each year held (since 2012) as part of the November general election. The board appoints a superintendent to oversee the day-to-day operation of the district. The seats on the board of education are allocated based on the population of the constituent municipalities, with sevens seats allocated to Raritan Township and two to Flemington.

References

External links 
Flemington-Raritan Regional School District

School Data for the Flemington-Raritan Regional School District, National Center for Education Statistics

Flemington, New Jersey
New Jersey District Factor Group I
Raritan Township, New Jersey
School districts in Hunterdon County, New Jersey